This is a list of conflicts in Algeria arranged chronologically from ancient to modern times. This list includes both nationwide and international types of war, including (but not limited to) the following: wars of independence, liberation wars, colonial wars, undeclared wars, proxy wars, territorial disputes, and world wars. Also listed might be any battle that occurred within the territory of what is today known as the, "People's Democratic Republic of Algeria" but was itself only part of an operation of a campaign of a theater of a war. There may also be periods of violent civil unrest listed, such as: riots, shootouts, spree killings, massacres, terrorist attacks, and civil wars. The list might also contain episodes of: human sacrifice, mass suicide, massacres, and genocides.

Ancient Times

Carthaginian Empire

264 BCE — 146 BCE Punic Wars

Kingdom of Numidia

112 BCE — 106 BCE Jugurthine War
111 BCE — 104 BCE Battle of Thala
110 BCE Battle of Suthul
108 BCE Battle of the Muthul

Roman Province of Africa

May 430 CE The Vandal Kingdom laid siege to the walled city of Hippo Regius.
October 431 CE Hippo Regius fell to the Vandals.
439 CE Genseric chose to break the treaty between the Vandals and the Roman Empire when he invaded the province of Africa Proconsularis.

Medieval Times

Vandal Kingdom

June 533 CE — March 534 CE Vandalic War

Byzantine Praetorian prefecture of Africa

534 CE — 577 CE The Moorish Wars
534 CE First Moorish Uprising
544 CE Second Moorish Uprising

Byzantine Exarchate of Africa

647 CE — 709 CE Muslim conquest of North Africa

Rashidun Caliphate

647 CE — 709 CE Muslim conquest of North Africa
656 CE — 661 CE First Fitna

Umayyad Caliphate

680 CE — 692 CE Second Fitna
744 CE — 746 CE Third Fitna

Abbasid Caliphate

809 CE — 827 CE Fourth Fitna

Zirid and Hammadid emirates 

 Hilalian invasion of North Africa

Almoravid Empire

1053 CE — 1080 CE Almoravid conquest of Northern Africa

Almohad Caliphate

1160 CE All of Ifriqiya was conquered and annexed by the Almohad Caliphate.

Zayyanid Kingdom 

 1235 CE — 1248 CE Zayyanid–Almohad wars
 1299 CE — 1307 Siege of Tlemcen
 1313 CE Zayyanid conquest of Algiers
 1326 CE Siege of Bejaia
 1329 CE Battle of Er Rias and Conquest of Ifriqiya
 1335 CE — 1337 CE Siege of Tlemcen
 1366 CE Béjaïa expedition
 1501 CE Battle of Mers-el-Kébir (1501)
 1505 CE Capture of Mers-el-Kébir by Spain
 1507 CE Battle of Mers-el-Kébir (1507)
 1509 CE Spanish conquest of Oran
 1510 CE Siege of Algiers
 1510 CE Siege of Mostaganem
 1518 CE Campaign of Tlemcen (1518)
 1535 CE Spanish expedition to Tlemcen (1535)
 1543 CE Spanish Campaign to Tlemcen and Abu Zayyan III reconquest
 1551 CE Campaign of Tlemcen (1551)
 1557 CE Campaign of Tlemcen (1557)

Modern Times

Regency of Algiers

 1516 CE Capture of Algiers
 1518 CE Fall of Tlemcen
 1529 CE Capture of the Peñón of Algiers
 1541 CE Algiers expedition (1541)
 1551 CE Campaign of Tlemcen
 1552 CE Tuggurt Expedition
 1556 CE Siege of Oran
 1557 CE Campaign of Tlemcen
 1558 CE Expedition to Mostaganem
 1627 CE Tunisian-Algerian war
1664 CE Djidjelli expedition
1681 CE — 1688 CE French-Algerian War 1681–88
 Conflicts between Hadj Chabane and Moulay Ismael
1692 CE Battle of Moulouya
1693 CE Siege of Oran
1699 CE — 1702 CE Maghrebi war
1699 CE — 1700 CE Mascara campaign (1699-1700)
1699 CE — 1700 CE Constantine campaign (1699-1700)
1700 CE Battle of Jouami' al-Ulama
1701 CE Battle of Chelif
1705 CE Algerian-Tunisian War
1707 CE Oran Expedition
1707 — 1708 CE Siege of Oran
1735 CE Algerian-Tunisian War
1756 CE Algerian-Tunisian war
1769 CE — 1772 CE Danish-Algerian War
1775 CE — 1785 CE Spanish-Algerian war
1775 CE Invasion of Algiers
1783 CE Bombardment of Algiers
1784 CE Bombardment of Algiers
1790 CE — 1792 CE Siege of Oran
1807 CE  Algerian-Tunisian war
1816 CE Bombardment of Algiers
1830 CE Invasion of Algiers
Disembarkement at Sidi Fredj
Battle of Staouéli
Battle of Sidi Khalef
Siege of Bordj Moulay Hassan

Emirate of Abdelkader
1832 CE Battle of Kheng Nettah
1835 CE Battle of Sig, Battle of Macta, Battle of Mascara
1836 CE Battle of Habrah, Battle of Tlemcen, Battle of Sikkak
1837 CE Battle of Reghaia, Expedition of the Col des Beni Aïcha, First Battle of Boudouaou, Battle of Somah, Battle of Dellys
1839 CE Battle of Mitijda
1840 CE Battle of Mazagran
1842 CE Battle of Beni Mered
1843 CE Battle of Smala
1844 CE Second Battle of Dellys
1845 CE Battle of Sidi Brahim
1846 CE Battle of Issers
1847 CE Battle of Oued Aslaf, Battle of Argueddin

Beylik of Constantine
1832 CE Battle of Bône
1833 CE 1st Battle of Bejaia
1835 CE 2nd Battle of Bejaia
1836 CE Battle of Constantine
1837 CE Siege of Constantine
1842 CE Battle of Ain Roumel
1842 CE Battle of Djbel Bou Taleb

French Département of Algeria

1830 CE — 1903 CE French conquest of Algeria
1850 CE –- 1871 CE Taiping Rebellion
1851 CE Bombardment of Salé
1853 CE –- 1856 CE Crimean War
1871 CE Mokrani revolt
1881 CE French conquest of Tunisia

Vichy France

1 September 1939 CE — 2 September 1945 CE Second World War
10 June 1940 CE — 2 May 1945 CE Mediterranean and Middle East theatre of World War II
10 June 1940 CE — 13 May 1943 CE North African Campaign
8 November 1942 CE — 16 November 1942 CE Operation Torch
8 November 1942 Operation Reservist
8 November 1942 Operation Terminal
8 May 1945 CE Sétif and Guelma massacre

French Département of Algérie

1 November 1, 1954 CE — 19 March 1962 CE Algerian War of Independence
1 November 1954 CE Toussaint Rouge
18 January 1955 CE Battle of Douar Souadek
18 January – 24 February 1955 CE Operation Véronique
September 1955 CE First battle of El Djorf
20 August 1955 CE Battle of Philippeville
April 1956 CE — 1 October 1956 CE Operation Blue Bird
30 September 1956 CE — 24 September 1957 CE Battle of Algiers
23 May 1957 CE — 25 May 1957 CE Battle of Agounennda
 4–12 August 1957 Battle of Bouzegza
21 january 1958 – 28 May 1958 Battle of the borders (Algerian war)

Provisional Government of the Algerian Republic

1 November 1954 CE — 19 March 1962 CE Algerian War of Independence
13 May 1958 CE Crisis
 28–31 May 1958 CE Battle of Bab el Bekkouche
July 1959 CE — March 1960 CE Operation Jumelles
21 April 1961 CE — 26 April 1961 CE Algiers putsch
23 March 1962 CE — 6 April 1962 CE Battle of Bab El Oued

People's Democratic Republic of Algeria

October 1963 CE Sand War
1980 CE Berber Spring
October 1988 CE Riots
26 December 1991 CE — February 2002 CE Algerian Civil War
3 April 1997 CE — 4 April 1997 CE Thalit massacre
22 April 1997 CE Haouch Khemisti massacre
16 June 1997 CE Daïat Labguer (M'sila) Massacre
27 July 1997 CE Si Zerrouk massacre
3 August 1997 CE Oued El-Had and Mezouara massacre
20 August 1997 CE — August 21, 1,997 CE Souhane massacre
26 August 1997 CE Beni Ali massacre
28 August 1997 CE Rais massacre
5 September 1997 CE - 6 September 1997 CE Beni Messous massacre
19 September 1997 CE — 20 September 1997 CE Guelb El-Kebir massacre
22 September 1997 CE — 23 September 1997 CE Bentalha massacre
23 December 1997 CE — 24 December 1997 CE Sid El-Antri massacre
30 December 1997 CE Wilaya of Relizane massacres
11 April 2002 CE — Present Insurgency in the Maghreb
16–19 January 2013 CE In Amenas hostage crisis
28 December 2010 CE — 10 January 2012 CE Algerian protests

References

See also

List of wars involving Algeria
Military of Algeria
People's National Army
Algerian National Navy
Algerian Air Force
Military history of Africa
African military systems up until the year 1800 CE
African military systems between the years 1800 CE and 1900 CE
African military systems after the year 1900 CE

Military history of Algeria
Conflicts